Paul Askham (born 26 October 1962) is a British former competitive ice dancer. With partner Sharon Jones, he is the 1985–1988 British national champion. They represented Great Britain at the 1988 Winter Olympics. 

They later went on to perform as principal skaters with Holiday on Ice, and also became the World Professional ice dance champions in Jaca Spain.

Askham has produced and directed shows in the UK, The USA and United Emirates.

Askham now works as a coach and the Director of coaching in Kent Valley Ice Centre in Seattle Washington. Askham is an all round coach and has produced a number of USA solo ice dance champions and medalists, along with free skaters reaching senior USA National Championships.

Competitive highlights
(with Jones)

References

External links
 

English male ice dancers
Living people
1962 births
Sportspeople from Blackpool
Olympic figure skaters of Great Britain
Figure skaters at the 1988 Winter Olympics
English emigrants to the United States